"The Obsolete Man" is episode 65 of the American television anthology series The Twilight Zone, starring Burgess Meredith as Romney Wordsworth, the accused, and Fritz Weaver as the Chancellor (and prosecutor). It originally aired on June 2, 1961, on CBS. The story was later adapted for The Twilight Zone Radio Dramas starring Jason Alexander as Wordsworth.

Opening narration

Plot
In a future totalitarian state, Romney Wordsworth is put on trial for being obsolete. His professed occupation as a librarian is punishable by death as the state has eliminated books. He believes in God, also proof of obsolescence, as the atheist state claims to have proven God does not exist. Following a bitter exchange, the Chancellor finds Wordsworth guilty and sentences him to death, allowing him to choose his method of execution. Wordsworth requests that he be granted a personal assassin, who will be the only one who knows the method of his death, and that his execution be televised nationwide. The Chancellor grants both requests.

Wordsworth summons the Chancellor to his now-monitored room, who agrees to this unusual request out of curiosity. The librarian reveals that the execution method he chose is a bomb set to go off in the room at midnight. The Chancellor expresses approval until Wordsworth further explains that the door is locked, and the Chancellor will die with him. He also points out that, as the events are being broadcast live, the State would risk losing its status in the people's eyes if it chose to rescue the Chancellor. Wordsworth proceeds to read from his illegal, long-hidden copy of the Bible, expressing his trust in God.

At the last minute, the Chancellor breaks down and begs to be let go "in the name of God." Wordsworth agrees to do so on those terms and unlocks the door for him. The Chancellor flees from the room while Wordsworth stays as the bomb explodes. Due to his cowardly display in Wordsworth's room and invocation of God, the Chancellor is replaced by his own subaltern and declared obsolete. He protests against this and tries to escape but is overwhelmed by the tribunal's attendants, who then beat him to death.

Closing narration
Unusually, Serling appears on camera to deliver the closing narration.

Cast
 Burgess Meredith as Romney Wordsworth
 Fritz Weaver as the Chancellor
 Josip Elic as the Subaltern
 Harry Fleer as Guard
 Harold Innocent as Man in Crowd

Original epilogue 
Usually Serling delivered his closing narration off-camera. But for the earlier episode ("A World of His Own"), Serling delivered the closing narration of that episode on-camera, as he would for "The Obsolete Man" and season 3's "The Fugitive." Serling's original narration was longer, but the middle section was cut for broadcast.  As scripted, the original narration reads as follows (with the cut section in italics):

In popular culture
Serling's opening narration is sampled in the song "Thieves! (Screamed the Ghost)" by American hip-hop duo Run the Jewels on their 2016 album, Run the Jewels 3.

References
 DeVoe, Bill. (2008). Trivia from The Twilight Zone. Albany, GA: Bear Manor Media. 
 Grams, Martin. (2008). The Twilight Zone: Unlocking the Door to a Television Classic. Churchville, MD: OTR Publishing. 
 Peak, Alexander S. (2006). "The Obsolete Man." LewRockwell.com.

External links
 

1961 American television episodes
Dystopian television episodes
Works about totalitarianism
The Twilight Zone (1959 TV series season 2) episodes
Television episodes written by Rod Serling